Erni Krusten  (30 April 1900 – 16 June 1984) was an Estonian writer. He was born Ernst Krustein in Muraste, Harku Parish, in a gardening family, and worked as a gardener himself.

In 1920 he began to pursue writing and his first book was published in 1927. He wrote prolifically, and often favored writing short works in prose.

He died 1984 in Tallinn.

Writings

Novels
"Mineviku jahil" (1929)
"Org Mägedi armastus" (1939)
"Pekside raamat" (1946)
"Nagu piisake meres" (1962)

Short prose collections
"Kanarbik" (1972)
"Pime armastus" (1941)
"Rahu nimel" (1951)
"Piitsa matused" (1957)
"Õnnetu armastus" (1957)
"Kevadet otsimas" (1960)
"Viis lugu" (1968)
"Rõõmunäljane" (1973)
"Vurriluu" (1980)
"Hull pääsuke" (1981)
"Metalliotsija" (1984)

Poetry
"Peegel tänaval" (1978)

Stories
"Vana võrukael" (1966)
"Väga halb hinne" (1967)
"Okupatsioon" (1969)

References
Biographical material in Okupacio, Esperanto translation of Okupatsioon, Pub. Tallinn, 1972.

1900 births
1984 deaths
People from Harku Parish
People from Kreis Harrien
Estonian male novelists
Estonian male poets
Estonian male short story writers
20th-century Estonian novelists
20th-century Estonian poets
20th-century short story writers
20th-century male writers
People's Writers of the Estonian SSR
Recipients of the Order of Friendship of Peoples